Amata bifasciata is a moth of the subfamily Arctiinae. It was described by Carl Heinrich Hopffer in 1857. It is found in Mozambique.

References

Endemic fauna of Mozambique
bifasciata
Moths described in 1857
Moths of Africa